Local is an unincorporated community in Jefferson County, in the U.S. state of Missouri.

History
A post office called Local was established in 1887, and remained in operation until 1904. It is uncertain why the name Local was applied to this community.

References

Unincorporated communities in Jefferson County, Missouri
Unincorporated communities in Missouri